Antigua and Barbuda and the United Kingdom of Great Britain and Northern Ireland (UK) are related through a long common history spanning from 1632 for Antigua, and 1678 for the smaller sister-isle of Barbuda through until 1981 for the joint-state. Antigua was one of the oldest English settlements in the West Indies, and served as a British hub of regional administration for the surrounding Leeward Islands.

Following the collapse of the British West Indies Federation in 1962 due-to internal power struggles, in 1967 Antigua and Barbuda attained self-governance was reorganized into a free association with the United Kingdom and known as the UK-West Indies Associated States (UK-WIAS) union.  Since the Antiguan and Barbudan date of independence in 1981, these nations continue to share ties through the Commonwealth of Nations, and as two of fifteen separate nations across the globe closely co-existing through sharing of the same Head of State, King Charles III as their Monarch.

Resident diplomatic missions 
 Antigua and Barbuda has a Antigua and Barbuda High Commission in London, England.
 The United Kingdom has both a resident Commissioner in St. John's, Antigua; and a non-resident United Kingdom High Commissioner regionally based from the separate island of Barbados.

See also 
 List of High Commissioners from the United Kingdom to the Eastern Caribbean, (at Barbados)
 Anglicisation
 Commonwealth Caribbean
 Commonwealth free trade
 Economic Partnership Agreements
 English Harbour
 Antiguans and Barbudans in the United Kingdom

References

External links 
The British Foreign and Commonwealth office – Antigua and Barbuda Profile
UK Trade & Investment (UKTI) – UK trade with Antigua and Barbuda
BBC.co.uk – Antigua and Barbuda profile
Timeline of joint Antiguan and Barbudan-British history

 
Antigua and Barbuda
United Kingdom
United Kingdom
United Kingdom and the Commonwealth of Nations
Relations of colonizer and former colony